The second general election to the Highland Council was held in May 2003, using 80 wards created for the first election, in 1999.  In 1999 and 2003 each ward elected one councillor by the first past the post system of election. Elections are held on a four-year cycle: therefore the next general election is scheduled for 2007.

Wards are grouped into areas. Councillors elected from a particular area become members of the relevant area committee. The areas are similar to the districts which were abolished in 1996, when the Highland region became a unitary council area.

There are plans to use new larger wards for the next general election, each electing three or four councillors by the single transferable vote system. The total number of councillors will remain the same. The single transferable vote system, with multi-member wards, is designed to produce a form of proportional representation.

Political representation
The 2003 election created a council of 55 independent councillors, 12 Liberal Democrats, Labour Party councillors and 6 Scottish National Party councillors.

Now, after two by-elections, there are 54 independent councillors, 12 Liberal Democrat councillors, 8 Labour Party councillors and 6 Scottish National Party councillors.

By-elections
There have been two by-elections since the 2003 election.

Beauly and Strathglass
In June 2004, a by-election was held to fill a vacancy in the Beauly and Strathglass ward, in the Inverness area. The vacancy was due to the resignation of an independent councillor. The by-election had no effect on the balance of political representation.

Lochardil
In August 2006, a by-election was held to fill a vacancy in the Lochardil ward, in the Inverness area. The vacancy was due to the death of a councillor.  The ward returned a Liberal Democrat to the council, so taking number of the seats held by that party up from 11 to 12.

Badenoch and Strathspey wards
There are five wards in the Badenoch and Strathspey area:

† Area Convener (or Area Chairman)

Caithness wards
There are 10 wards in the Caithness area:
 

† Area Convener

Inverness wards
The Inverness area includes Loch Ness, Strathglass and the City of Inverness.

The city lacks clearly defined boundaries. In ward descriptions below the city means the urban area centred on the former burgh of Inverness.
 
There are 23 wards in the area:

† Area Convener (or Provost and Area Convener)

Lochaber wards
There are eight wards in the Lochaber area:

† Area Convener

Nairn wards
The Nairn area is mostly rural. Ward boundaries radiate from the town of Nairn (a former burgh), dividing the town between all four wards:

† Area Convener (or Area Chairman)

Ross and Cromarty wards
There are 18 wards in the Ross and Cromarty area:

† Area Convener

Skye and Lochalsh wards
There are six wards in the Skye and Lochalsh area:

† Area Convener (or Area Ceannaire)

Sutherland wards
There are six wards in the Sutherland area:

Highland council wards
Lists of wards in Scotland